Prem Amar 2 is a 2019 Bengali romantic drama film. The film was written and directed by Bidula Bhattacharjee It was shot primarily in Murshidabad, with some scenes shot in Sylhet. Prem Amar 2 was then released on February 8, 2019.

Plot
Two young people, Apurba (Pujja Cherry Roy) and Joy (Adrit Roy), long for each other after they meet and fall deeply in love in college. Incidentally, they turn out to be neighbors.

Cast
 Adrit Roy as Joy Choudhury 
 Puja Cherry Roy as Apurba Choudhury 
 Biswajit Chakraborty  as Joy's father
 Shubhadra 
 Nader Chowdhury
 Gulshan Ara Akter Champa
 Shristi Pandey 
 Sourav Das
 Jannatun Nur Moon

Release
The official trailer of the film was released by SVF on January 4, 2019.

Soundtrack

The soundtrack was composed by Savvy, and the lyrics were written by Anyaman and Ritam Sen. The songs are sung by Kunal Ganjawala, Adrit Roy, Imran (Bangladesh), and Kona (Bangladesh).

References

External links
 

Bengali-language Bangladeshi films
Bengali-language Indian films
2019 films
2010s Bengali-language films
Jaaz Multimedia films